Carl Adolph Agardh (23 January 1785 in Båstad, Sweden – 28 January 1859 in Karlstad) was a Swedish botanist specializing in algae, who was eventually appointed bishop of Karlstad.

Biography 

In 1807 he was appointed teacher of mathematics at Lund University, in 1812 appointed professor of botany and natural sciences, and was elected a member of the Royal Swedish Academy of Sciences in 1817, and of the Swedish Academy in 1831.

He was ordained a clergyman in 1816, received two parishes as prebend, and was a representative in the clerical chamber of the Swedish Parliament on several occasions from 1817. He was rector magnificus of Lund University 1819-1820 and was appointed bishop of Karlstad in 1835, where he remained until his death. He was the father of Jacob Georg Agardh, also a botanist.

System of plant classification 

The Classes Plantarum has nine primary divisions into which his classes and natural orders are grouped. These are, with class numbers; 
 Acotyledonae 1–3 (Algae, Lichenes, Fungi)
 Pseudocotyledonae 4–7 (Muscoideae, Tetradidymae, Filices, Equisetaceae)
 Cryptocotyledonae 8–12 (Macropodae, Spadicinae, Glumiflorae, Liliiflorae, Gynandrae)
 Phanerocotyledonae incompletae 13–16 (Micranthae, Oleraceae, Epichlamydeae, Columnantherae)
 Phanerocotyledonae completae, hypogynae, monopetalae 17 (Tubiflorae)
 Phanerocotyledonae completae, hypogynae, polypetalae 18–22 (Centrisporae, Brevistylae, Polycarpellae, Valvisporae, Columniferae)
 Phanerocotyledonae completae, discigynae, monopetalae 23 (Tetraspermae)
 Phanerocotyledonae completae, discigynae, polypetalae 24–26 (Gynobaseae, Trihilitae, Hypodicarpae) 
 Phanerocotyledonae completae, porigynae 27–33 (Subaggregatae, Aridifoliae, Succulentae, Calycanthemae, Peponiferae, Icosandrae, Leguminosae)

Each class then contains a number of orders (families). For instance, Liliiflorae contains 11 orders;
 Liliiflorae
 43 Asparageae
 44 Asphodeleae
 45 Coronariae
 46 Veratreae
 47 Commelineae
 48 Pontedereae
 49 Dioscorinae
 50 Haemodoreae
 51 Irideae
 52 Narcisseae
 53 Bromeliaceae

Publications 

He devoted considerable attention to political economy and as "a leading liberal", he "succeeded in improving and raising the standards of education in Sweden".  He also wrote on theological and other subjects, but his reputation chiefly rests on his botanical works, especially Systema algarum, Species algarum rite cognitae and Classes plantarum on biological classification, and Icones Algarum (1824, 1820–28, and 1828–35). The greatest part of his Manual of Botany (2 vols., Malmoe, 1829–32) has been translated into German.

List of selected publications 

 
 
Algarum decas prima [-quarta] /auctore Carolo Ad. Agardh
Dispositio algarum Sueciae /cuctore Carolo Adolfo Agardh 
Caroli A. Agardh Synopsis algarum Scandinaviae : adjecta dispositione universali algarum 
Adnotationes botanicae (with Swartz, Olof, Sprengel, Kurt Polycarp Joachim, and Wikström, Joh. Em)

Notes

References

Bibliography 

 
 Short biography in French
 Lund University, Botanical Museum
 Lund Museum - Collections: algae

External links

1785 births
1859 deaths
People from Båstad Municipality
Swedish botanists
Members of the Royal Swedish Academy of Sciences
Members of the Swedish Academy
Swedish phycologists
Pteridologists
Swedish mycologists
Academic staff of Lund University
Swedish taxonomists
Bishops of Karlstad
19th century in Skåne County